On the Evidence is a Canadian legal drama television series which aired on CBC Television from 1975 to 1977.

Premise
This series presented dramatisations of court trials, some of which were based on real cases. Judges, lawyers and court clerks were portrayed by Canadian Bar Association members while actors played the accused and the witnesses. Some studio audience members were chosen to form the jury. The proceedings were recorded over two hours then condensed for the hour-long broadcast.

Scheduling
This hour-long series was broadcast as follows (times in North American Eastern):

References

External links

 

CBC Television original programming
1975 Canadian television series debuts
1977 Canadian television series endings